The Baumann House is a listed building in Aarhus, Denmark. The building was constructed in 1911 and was listed in the national Danish registry of protected buildings and places by the Danish Heritage Agency on 18 September 1996. The building is situated in the central Indre By neighborhood on Jægergårdsgade adjacent to the Aarhus Central Workshops.

History 
The building was constructed as the administrative offices of the Danish National Railroad's central rail workshops in Aarhus. The workshops had been the primary repair facility for trains and trams in Jutland and Fuenen from 1880 and the workforce had grown steadily to some 750 people by 1910. The constant expansion of the national railroads and the growing rolling stock meant the workshops were constantly expanding necessitating an administrative unit to oversee the work. The office building was completed in 1911.

The workforce peaked with some 1850 people in the post-war years but in the 1950s repair work was gradually centralized in Copenhagen and the workforce gradually started shrinking in the following decades. in 1990 DSB decided to close the facility and reassign the remaining 140 workers. The buildings were listed in 1995 after which they were sold off.

In 2007 the two bottom floors were used for fitness and spinning.

Architecture 
The building was designed by Povl Baumann from whom the building gets its name. The building has powerful proportions and contrary to other buildings in the area it stands freely, separated from other structures. It is situated on the highest point in the area, on a hill overlooking the workshops below. The building material is red brick like most other structures in the area. The roof is pitched and features a large dormer window on the front facade with a balcony on top while there's a series of smaller dormer windows behind. Brick cornices frame the eaves on the front and back.

References

External links 
 

Listed buildings in Aarhus
Houses completed in 1911
Neoclassical architecture in Aarhus